Travis Padgett (born December 13, 1986) is a track and field sprint athlete who competes internationally for the United States. He was an All-American and national champion sprinter at Clemson University.

He broke the NCAA collegiate record at the 2008 US Olympic Trials qualifiers; recording a time of 9.89 seconds. This brought him into the top twenty fastest athletes in the 100 meters event, and the top ten American athletes. In the final of the Olympic Trials, Padgett recorded a wind assisted time of 9.85 s but finished in fourth position. This meant he did not qualify for the Olympic event. Padgett represented the United States at the 2008 Summer Olympics in Beijing. He competed at the 4x100 metres relay together with Rodney Martin, Darvis Patton and Tyson Gay. In their qualification heat they did not finish due to a mistake in the baton exchange and they were eliminated.

At the beginning of the 2009 athletics season, he decided to turn professional, leaving the collegiate system.

Personal bests

All information from IAAF Profile

References

External links
 
 TeamUSA Profile

1986 births
Living people
African-American male track and field athletes
American male sprinters
Olympic track and field athletes of the United States
Athletes (track and field) at the 2008 Summer Olympics
Clemson Tigers men's track and field athletes
21st-century African-American sportspeople
20th-century African-American people